Jesse Nathaniel Smith (December 2, 1834 – June 5, 1906) was a Mormon pioneer, church leader, colonizer, politician and frontiersman. He was a member of the Church of Jesus Christ of Latter-day Saints (LDS Church). He was a first cousin to Joseph Smith, founder of the Latter Day Saint movement.

Early life
Jesse N. Smith was born the youngest of three sons to Silas Smith (1779–1839) and his second wife Mary Aikens (1797–1877) in Stockholm, New York. Both of Smith's grandfathers, Asael Smith (1744–1830) and Nathaniel Aikens (1757–1836), served in the American Revolutionary War. According to Smith, his grandfather Aikens served under General George Washington. Smith's father, Silas, married his first wife, Ruth Stevens, in 1806. Together they had seven children: Charles, Charity, Curtis Stevens, Samuel, Stephen, Susan and Asahel. After the death of his first wife, Silas courted Mary Aikens while she was teaching school in Stockholm and they married in 1828. The oldest child of this union was Silas Sanford Smith (1830–1910) followed by John Aikens Smith (1832–1838). Unfortunately John died due to exposure and unfit conditions from mob persecutions.

Jesse's father was a younger brother of Joseph Smith Sr., making Jesse N. a first cousin of Joseph Smith Jr. Silas was converted when Joseph Sr. and his youngest son Don Carlos Smith visited him in 1830, but was not baptized into the church until 1835 by his nephew Hyrum Smith. Mary joined the church a couple of years later after they moved to Kirtland, Ohio. Mob persecutions sent this Smith family first towards Far West, Missouri and when they learned about Lilburn W. Boggs' Missouri Executive Order 44, nicknamed the "extermination order", they turned back to Illinois. John Aikens died near Louisiana, Missouri and then Silas died while living near Pittsfield, Illinois. Mary was left a widow to raise her two young boys.

Smith's cousin William tried to persuade Mary Aikens Smith against following Brigham Young, but she followed the main body of Latter Day Saints west to the Utah Territory. At the age of twelve, Jesse N. drove his Uncle John's two yokes of oxen on the journey.

Church service
Smith served in many leadership positions for the LDS Church. His cousin George A. Smith, serving as a member of the Quorum of the Twelve Apostles, sent a letter informing him he was to serve as a missionary in Europe. When he arrived in Salt Lake City for departure he was told he would serve in the Scandinavia Mission. In the spring of 1862, at the age of 27, he was asked by Brigham Young to serve as Mission president of that mission. He went home for a brief period, but returned to the Scandinavian Mission again in 1868 to serve as mission president for a second time. He assisted almost 3,000 members of the church in emigrating to America. Smith learned to read and speak Danish on his missions.

Smith served as the first Stake President of the Eastern Arizona Stake from 1879 to 1887 followed by the Snowflake Stake from 1887 until his death. In 1882, he predicted that a temple would be built in Pima, Arizona. The Gila Valley Arizona Temple is between Pima and Thatcher.

Colonizer
Smith helped colonize different Mormon settlements. The church leadership asked him, his mother and brother to help settle Parowan, Utah in 1851. He also helped in creating the settlement of Minersville. In 1878 he went to explore an area in the Arizona Territory where Mormon settlements were being established. Smith returned to report his findings to John Taylor, who had succeeded Young. Taylor asked Smith to relocate there as a church leader. He settled his family in what is now Snowflake, Arizona. In 1884, he was assigned to a committee for the church to purchase land in Mexico for Mormon colonization.

Statesman
Smith was involved in local politics throughout his adult life. He served as Mayor of Parowan from 1859 to 1861, as a member of the 5th Utah Territorial Legislature in 1855–56, the 22nd Utah Territorial Legislature in 1876 and the 24th Utah Territorial Legislature in 1880, and in the 19th Arizona Territorial Legislature in 1897. He was elected probate judge of Iron County in 1866 by Utah Territory Legislators and again appointed by the Arizona territorial governor. He served as a captain in the local militia while in Utah Territory. He also held the positions of Deputy U.S. Marshal, Iron County District Attorney, surveyor, city clerk, town councilman, city magistrate, stockman and established cooperative mercantiles in both Utah and Arizona.

Wives and children
Smith practiced plural marriage. He had five wives and forty-four children. Smith was eighteen years old when his oldest child was born and seventy when his youngest was born. Of the forty-four children, forty-two lived to adulthood, forty were married and thirty-eight had children.

Death
Jesse N. Smith died unexpectedly at his home in Snowflake after battling an illness. Four of his five wives survived him at his death.

Notable relations 

 Nephew of Joseph Smith, Sr., Lucy Mack Smith and John Smith
 1st cousin of Joseph Smith
 1st cousin of Hyrum Smith
 1st cousin of Elias Smith
 1st cousin of Samuel H. Smith
 1st cousin of William Smith
 1st cousin of Don Carlos Smith
 1st cousin of George A. Smith
 1st cousin, once removed, of John Smith
 1st cousin, once removed, of Joseph Smith III
 1st cousin, once removed, of Joseph F. Smith
 1st cousin, once removed, of Alexander H. Smith
 1st cousin, once removed, of David Hyrum Smith
 1st cousin, once removed, of John Henry Smith
 1st cousin, twice removed, of George Albert Smith
 1st cousin, twice removed, of Hyrum M. Smith
 1st cousin, twice removed, of Joseph Fielding Smith
 Great grandfather of Jake Flake
 3rd great grandfather of Jeff Groscost
 2nd great grandfather of Jeff Flake
 Daughter Leah married John Hunt Udall
 Son Asahel H. married Pauline Udall, daughter of David King Udall

See also

 The Church of Jesus Christ of Latter-day Saints in Arizona
 List of people with the most children

References

Further reading
 "Six decades in the early west. The Journal of Jesse N. Smith",  Jesse N. Smith Family Association (Publishers Press, Salt Lake City),  1970.

External links
 Jesse N. Smith Website
 
 Jesse N. Smith History
 
 Norma Larson Elliott collection on Jesse Nathaniel and Margaret F. Smith, MSS 8683 at L. Tom Perry Special Collections, Brigham Young University

1834 births
1906 deaths
19th-century American politicians
19th-century Mormon missionaries
American Mormon missionaries in Denmark
American leaders of the Church of Jesus Christ of Latter-day Saints
Arizona pioneers
Latter Day Saints from Arizona
Latter Day Saints from New York (state)
Latter Day Saints from Utah
Members of the Arizona Territorial Legislature
Members of the Utah Territorial Legislature
Mission presidents (LDS Church)
Mormon pioneers
People from Parowan, Utah
People from Snowflake, Arizona
People from Stockholm, New York
Smith family (Latter Day Saints)